Transgender Dysphoria Blues is the sixth studio album by the American punk rock band Against Me!. The album was released on January 21, 2014, by Total Treble Music and Xtra Mile Recordings. The album deals with gender dysphoria, following Laura Jane Grace's gender transition and coming out.

Recording and production
The band first announced work on a new album in November 2011 The first sessions for the album were a false start, where the band started recording some basic tracks and then went on tour, and decided to scrap and start over when they got back from tour. Then, the record was completely recorded except for vocals when drummer Jay Weinberg quit the band. The band first tried to have fill-in drummer Atom Willard record drum tracks to match the previously recorded tracks, but it wasn't working. Starting from scratch, the band began recording the album a final time at Studio 606 in February 2013. In May 2013, long-time bassist Andrew Seward also left the band. A month later, Fat Mike of NOFX joined the band in the studio, playing on three songs, two of which appear on the album. That same month, tracking for the album was completed.

Commercial performance
The album debuted on the Billboard 200 at No. 23, their highest debut yet on the chart.  It also debuted at No. 6 on Top Rock Albums,  with 10,000 copies sold in its first week. It has sold 45,000 copies in the United States as of August 2016.

Critical reception

The album received widespread praise with a metacritic score of 82 out of 100 indicating universal acclaim. In his review for Now Magazine, Joshua Kloke described the record as having "career-defining clarity" and "increased confidence," writing that "Grace looks inward and employs conviction unheard since their 2002 debut, Reinventing Axl Rose." Will Hermes of Rolling Stone rated the album three-and-a-half stars out of five, and called it "A series of bracing songs about a self-destructive girl in a boy's body, it's a thematic offspring of Lou Reed (see Berlin, etc.)", and noted how "it takes balls to come out this way, in this genre" wishing Laura "God-speed, sister." Also, Hermes said that the album musically "sticks to the band's established brand of warrior-cry punk metal", and this "limits the range of what might be an ever braver new world, one glimpsed on the softer acoustic 'Two Coffins.'" Dan Weiss of Spin called the album "one of the most fascinating records of the year," rating it eight out of ten.

Loudwire ranked the album 23 in their "66 best rock albums of the decade."

Accolades

Track listing

Personnel

Band
 Laura Jane Grace – lead vocals, guitar, bass (except for 2 tracks), art direction, producer
 James Bowman – guitar, backing vocals
 Atom Willard – drums, percussion

Additional musicians
 Fat Mike – bass (tracks 3, 6)

Production and design
 Billy Bush – recording engineer
 Steak Mtn – design, typography, and illustration

Charts

References 

2014 albums
Against Me! albums
Xtra Mile Recordings albums
Concept albums
Transgender-related music
Glam punk albums
Melodic hardcore albums
LGBT-related albums